The Little River is a perennial river of the Snowy River catchment, located in the Alpine region of the Australian state of Victoria. It is one of two rivers of the same name that are tributaries of the Snowy River, the other being the Little River (Kosciuszko National Park).

Course and features
The Little River rises below Mount Stradbroke in a remote alpine wilderness area within the Alpine National Park, and flows generally southeast, the south and leaves the national park, before heading southeast, then south by southeast, re-entering the Alpine National Park and flowing through the Snowy River National Park; joined by one minor tributary, before reaching its confluence with the Snowy River west of the Sugarloaf in the Shire of East Gippsland. The river descends  over its  course.

At the locality of Wulgulmerang, the river is traversed by the Snowy River Road (C608) and McKillips Road (C611).

Little River Gorge

A second lookout has views toward the gorge and Little River Falls.

History
The traditional custodians of the land surrounding the Little River are the Australian Aboriginal Bidawal and Nindi-Ngudjam Ngarigu Monero peoples.

See also

 List of rivers of Australia
 Mount Kosciuszko

References

External links
 
 
 
 

East Gippsland catchment
Rivers of Gippsland (region)
Canyons and gorges of Australia
Landforms of Victoria (Australia)
Snowy River